Denis Donohue (born October 22, 1976) is an American stand-up comedian.

Personal life
Denis Donohue is an American born stand-up comedian with Irish, Italian, and Dutch roots. Both of Donohue's parents are American Airlines employees. He went to high school at St. Francis Preparatory School and college at SUNY Plattsburgh where he received a Bachelor of Arts in Criminal Justice and performed in several of the university's dramatic and comedic productions.

Career
Donohue began his stand up comedy career on January 7, 1997 at the Manhattan comedy club Stand Up New York.  He performs regularly in his hometown of New York but spends the majority of his time performing at over 50 colleges and universities across the United States. Notable moments in his career include winning, over 400 other competitors, the Connecticut Comedy Festival and being named one of the funniest stand up comedians under 30 by the New York Underground Comedy Festival.

Stand-up comedy
In 2007 Donohue released the album "Unholy War" on Next Round Entertainment.

TV & Radio
Denis has appeared on the Howard Stern Show, The Barbara Walters Special, and the nationally syndicated The Bob & Tom Show.

Tours

Donohue was the opening act on Steve Hofstetter's "Cure for the Cable Guy" tour.  Since then he's headlined two tours of his own: "The Unholy Tour" to promote his debut album "Unholy War", and "The Big Little Tour" with fellow comedians Phil Mazo and Mike Trainor.

Discography

Albums
Unholy War (2007)

References

External links
Official website
Denis Donohue on MySpace
Denis Donohue on YouTube

American stand-up comedians
Living people
1976 births
State University of New York at Plattsburgh alumni
Comedians from New York City
21st-century American comedians